Mario Vilella Martínez (born 3 July 1995) is a Spanish tennis player. He has a career high ATP singles ranking of No. 158 achieved on 19 July 2021. He also has a career high ATP doubles ranking of No. 286 achieved on 23 November 2020.

Professional career

2015
Vilella Martínez made his ATP main draw debut at the 2015 Valencia Open in the doubles draw partnering Eduardo Russi Assumpção.

2020
Vilella Martínez made his Grand Slam debut at the 2020 Australian Open as a qualifier where he lost to sixteenth seed Karen Khachanov.

2021
Vilella Martínez made his debut at the 2021 French Open as a qualifier where he lost to eleventh seed fellow Spaniard  Roberto Bautista Agut. In July, he won his second Challenger title in Todi, Italy defeating Federico Gaio. As a result he reached a new career high ranking of No. 158 on 19 July 2021.

Performance timelines

Singles 
Current through the 2022 French Open.

Doubles 
Current after the 2022 Argentina Open.

Challenger and Futures finals

Singles: 21 (11 titles, 10 runner-ups)

Doubles: 15 (7 titles, 8 runner-ups)

Notes

References

External links
 
 

1995 births
Living people
Spanish male tennis players
Tennis players from the Valencian Community